Thalasseleotris is a genus of gobies comprising two species in the family Thalasseleotrididae from the south-western Pacific Ocean in the seas off Australia and New Zealand. The generic name is derived from the Greek Thalassa meaning "sea" and the generic name Eleotris as at the time it was named the genus was considered to be in the family Eleotridae.

Species
The two species in Thalasseleotris are:

 Thalasseleotris adela Hoese & Larson, 1987 - Marine gudgeon
 Thalasseleotris iota Hoese & Roberts, 2005 - New Zealand pygmy sleeper

References

Thalasseleotrididae
Taxa named by Douglass F. Hoese
Taxa named by Helen K. Larson